Eta Sigma Gamma ( or ESG) is an honor society for health education. It was founded on August 14, 1967 at Ball State University "to elevate the standards, ideals, competence and ethics of professionally trained individuals in and for the health science discipline through teaching/education, service and research."

History and Mission
ESG was founded at Ball State University by Drs. Robert Synovitz, Warren Schaller, and William Bock. The founding mission of ESG was "to further the professional competence and dedication of individual members in the health science discipline and the promotion of this discipline." The Greek letters, were chosen as the organization's letters as a representation of the letters "HSC", an abbreviation of the term health science. Twenty-one current Ball State students, four former Ball State students and five faculty members were installed as the charter members of Alpha chapter.

In 1999, Eta Sigma Gamma became a member of the Coalition of National Health Education Organizations in the United States. In joining the Coalition, ESG joined the ranks of larger organizations including the Society for Public Health Education, American Public Health Association, American Association for Health Education, and American School Health Association.

In 2017, the organization declared its inaugural class of Fellows of Eta Sigma Gamma who were described as "instrumental in the formation and development of the Honorary." The 2017 class of fellows included founding officers and members, instrumental chapter advisors, and officers of the organization. Fellows are entitled and encouraged to use the post-nominal letters "FESG."

Membership
As of ####, there are ## members of Eta Sigma Gamma disbursed throughout the United States.

The primary path to membership is through a student membership with a chapter at an associated university. University students are eligible for membership after declaring a major or minor area of study in health education and meeting a minimum GPA requirement. Professional membership is available to individuals who have a degree in health education and apply to join the Chapter-at-Large.

Chapters 
In addition to the national at-large professional chapter, the society has installed over 125 chapters, including the following. Active chapters listed in bold, inactive chapters listed in italics. 

This is an incomplete list.

Notable Members 

 Dr. R. Morgan Pigg

Notes

References

Honor societies
Student organizations established in 1967
1967 establishments in Indiana